Erratic Valley is a short valley on Alexander Island, Antarctica, that joins Ablation Valley from the north. It was named from the large number of erratic igneous blocks observed in the valley by a University of Aberdeen field party which mapped the area in 1978–79. The site lies within Antarctic Specially Protected Area (ASPA) No.147.

See also
 Flatiron Valley
 Moutonnée Valley
 Viking Valley

References 

Valleys of Antarctica
Valleys of Alexander Island
Antarctic Specially Protected Areas